Elections to Liverpool City Council were held on 1 November 1937. One third of the council seats were up for election, the term of office of each councillor being three years.

Eight of the forty seats up for election were uncontested.

After the election, the composition of the council was:

Election result

Ward results

* - Councillor seeking re-election

Comparisons are made with the 1934 election results.

Abercromby

Aigburth

Allerton

Anfield

Breckfield

Brunswick

Castle Street

Childwall

Croxteth

Dingle

Edge Hill

Everton

Exchange

Fairfield

Fazakerley

Garston

Granby

Great George

Kensington

Kirkdale

Little Woolton

Low Hill

Much Woolton

Netherfield

North Scotland

Old Swan

Prince's Park

Sandhills

St. Anne's

St. Domingo

St. Peter's

Sefton Park East

Sefton Park West

South Scotland

Vauxhall

Walton

Warbreck

Wavertree

Wavertree West

West Derby

Aldermanic Elections

Aldermanic Election 1 December 1937

Caused by the death of Alderman Maxwell Hyslop Maxwell C.B. C.B.E. (Conservative, last elected as an alderman on 9 November 1935), in whose place Councillor John Morris Griffith (Conservative, elected to the Wavertree ward on 1 November 1936) was elected as an alderman on 1 December 1937.

The term of office to expire on 9 November 1941.

Aldermanic Election 2 March 1938

Caused by the death on 25 January 1938 of Alderman Sir Thomas White (Conservative, last elected as an alderman on 9 November 1932), in whose place Councillor William Thomas Roberts J.P. (Conservative, elected to the Abercromby ward on 1 November 1936) was elected as an alderman by the councillors on 2 March 1938.

The term of office to expire on 9 November 1938.

Aldermanic Election 6 July 1938

Caused by the death on 22 May 1938 of Alderman Edwin Haigh (Conservative, last elected as an alderman on 9 November 1935). In whose place, Councillor Robert Duncan French (Conservative, elected to the West Derby ward on 1 November 1937) was elected as an alderman by the councillors on 6 July 1938.

The term of office to expire on 9 November 1941.

Aldermanic Election 27 July 1938

Caused by the death on 5 July 1938 of Alderman James Bolger (Independent, last elected as an alderman on 9 November 1932). In whose place Councillor George Young Williamson (Conservative, elected to represent Anfield on 1 November 1937) was elected to the post of alderman on 27 July 1938.

The term of office to expire on 9 November 1938.

By-elections

No.31 Fairfield, 30 November 1937

Caused by the death of Councillor John Barry (Conservative, elected 1 November 1935).

The term of office to expire on 1 November 1938.

No.1 Sandhills, 9 December 1937

Caused by the election as an alderman on 6 October 1937 of Councillor John Wolfe Tone Morrissey JP (Labour, last elected to the Sandhills ward on 1 November 1936), following the death on 7 September 1937 of Alderman Henry Walker (Labour, last elected as an alderman on 9 November 1935).

The term of office to expire on 1 November 1939.

No.2 North Scotland, 9 December 1937

Caused by the death on 13 September 1937 of Councillor Henry Gaskin (Labour, elected 1 November 1935).

The term of office to expire on 1 November 1938.

No.11 Brunswick, 9 December 1937

Caused by the resignation of Councillor Patrick Moorhead (Labour, elected unopposed for the Brunswick ward on 1 November 1937)

The term of office due to expire on 1 November 1940.

No.34 Wavertree, 11 January 1938

Caused by Councillor John Morris Griffith J.P. (Conservative, elected to the Wavertree ward on 1 November 1936) being elected by the councillors as an alderman on 1 December 1937, following the death of Alderman Maxwell Hyslop Maxwell C.B. C.B.E. (Conservative, elected as an alderman 9 November 1935).

The term of office due to expire on 1 November 1939.

No.38 Childwall, 24 February 1938

Caused by the resignation of Councillor Alan Anderson Boyle (Liberal, elected unopposed 1 November 1936)

The term of office due to expire on 1 November 1939.

No.9 Abercromby, Tuesday 5 April 1938

Caused by the election as an alderman of Councillor William Thomas Roberts J.P. (Conservative, elected to the Abercromby ward on 1 November 1936) was elected as an alderman by the councillors on 2 March 1938, following the death on 25 January 1938 of Alderman Sir Thomas White (Conservative, last elected as an alderman on 9 November 1932).

The term of office due to expire on 1 November 1939.

No.15 Sefton Park East, Tuesday 31 May 1938

Occasioned by the resignation of Councillor Eric Douglas Mackay Heriot-Hill (Conservative, elected to the Sefton Park East ward on 1 November 1936).

The term of office due to expire on 1 November 1939.

No.32 Old Swan, Tuesday 14 June 1938

Caused by the death in May 1938 of Councillor John Waterworth (Conservative, elected to the Old Swan ward on 1 November 1937).

The term of office due to expire on 1 November 1940.

No.24 Kirkdale, Tuesday 26 July 1938

Caused by the resignation of Councillor Arthur Mackson Brown (Conservative, elected for the Kirkdale ward on 1 November 1936).

The term of office due to expire on 1 November 1939.

No.28 West Derby, 26 July 1938

Caused by Councillor Robert Duncan French (Conservative, elected to the West Derby ward on 1 November 1937) being elected by the councillors as an alderman on 6 July 1938, following the death on 22 May 1938 of Alderman Edwin Haigh (Conservative, last elected as an alderman on 9 November 1935).

The term of office due to expire on 1 November 1940.

No.29 Anfield, 30 August 1938

Caused by the election to the post of alderman on 27 July 1938 of Councillor George Young Williamson (Conservative, elected to represent Anfield on 1 November 1937), following the death on 5 July 1938 of Alderman James Bolger.

The term of office due to expire on 1 November 1940.

See also

 Liverpool City Council
 Liverpool Town Council elections 1835 - 1879
 Liverpool City Council elections 1880–present
 Mayors and Lord Mayors of Liverpool 1207 to present
 History of local government in England

References

1937
1937 English local elections
1930s in Liverpool